The Ashina (Middle Chinese: (Guangyun) ) were a tribe and the ruling dynasty of the Göktürks. This clan rose to prominence in the mid-6th century when the leader, Bumin Qaghan, revolted against the Rouran Khaganate. The two main branches of the family, one descended from Bumin and the other from his brother Istämi, ruled over the eastern and western parts of the Göktürk confederation, respectively.

Origin 
Primary Chinese sources ascribed different origins to the Ashina tribe. Ashina were first attested to 439, as reported by the Book of Sui: on the 18th day of the 10th month, the Tuoba ruler Emperor Taiwu of Northern Wei overthrew Juqu Mujian of the Northern Liang in eastern Gansu, and 500 Ashina families fled northwest to the Rouran Khaganate near Gaochang. According to the Book of Zhou, History of the Northern Dynasties, and New Book of Tang, the Ashina clan was a component of the Xiongnu confederation. but this is contested. Göktürks were also posited as having originated from an obscure Suo state (索國), north of the Xiongnu. According to the Book of Sui and the Tongdian, they were "mixed barbarians" (záhú) from Pingliang.

According to some researchers (Duan, Xue, Tang, and Lung) the Ashina tribe was descended from the Tiele confederation, who were likewise associated with the Xiongnu. Like the Göktürks, the Tiele were probably one of many nomadic Turkic peoples on the steppe. However, Lee & Kuang (2017) state that Chinese histories did not describe the Ashina-led Göktürks as descending from the Dingling or belonging to the Tiele confederation.

Etymology 
Several researchers, including Peter B. Golden, H. W. Haussig, S. G. Klyashtorny, Carter V. Findley, D. G. Savinov, B. A. Muratov, S. P. Guschin, and András Róna-Tas have posited that the term Ashina ultimately descends from an Indo-European source, possibly Tocharian or from one of the many Eastern Iranian tribal groups, such as the Saka and Wusun.

Carter V. Findley assumes that the name "Ashina" comes from one of the Saka languages of central Asia and means "blue" (which translates to Proto-Turkic *kȫk, whence Old Turkic 𐰚𐰇𐰚‎ kök, and same in all Modern Turkic languages). The color blue is identified with the east, so that Göktürk, another name for the Turkic empire, meant the "Turks of the East"; meanwhile, Peter Benjamin Golden favours a more limited denotation of Göktürks as denoting only the Eastern Turks. This idea is seconded by Hungarian researcher András Róna-Tas, who finds it plausible "that we are dealing with a royal family and clan of Saka origin". Findley also said that the term böri, used to identify the ruler's retinue as 'wolves', probably also derived from one of the Iranian languages.

H. W. Haussig and S. G. Kljyashtorny suggest an association between the name and the compound "kindred of Ashin" ahşaẽna (in Old Persian).  This is so even in East Turkestan; then the desired form would be in the Sogdian xs' yn' k (-әhšēnē) "blue, dark"; Khotan-Saka (Brahmi) āşşeiņa (-āşşena) "blue", where a long -ā- emerged as development ahş-> āşş-; in Tocharian A āśna- "blue, dark" (from Khotan-Saka and Sogdian). There is textual support for either of these versions in the Göktürk Orkhon inscriptions, in which the Göktürks are described as the "Blue Turks"; being descended from the marriage between Blue Sky and the Brown Earth.

According to Kuastornyj, the perfect translation of "Ashina" as an Indo-European word meaning "blue" indicates that the Türks of the First Turkic Khaganate period were aware of the non-Türkic origin of the name "Ashina", and of the dual ethnic origin of the early Türks. In the view of Louis Bazin, this knowledge was being suppressed in the Second Turkic Khaganate period by the Türkic nationalist policies of Bilge Qaghan.

The name "Ashina" was recorded in ancient Muslim chronicles in these forms: Aś(i)nas (al-Tabari), Ānsa (Hudud al-'Alam), Śaba (Ibn Khordadbeh), Śana, Śaya (Al-Masudi).P. B. Golden, "Irano-Turcica: The Khazar sacral kingship revisited," in Acta Orientalia Hungarica 60:2 (2007) p. 165, 172, n. 33 

 Alternative etymologies 
Based on Chinese sources' testament that the Ashina, upon becoming the head of Göktürks, exhibited a tuğ banner with a wolf head over their gate in reminiscence of its origins,Zhoushu, vol. 50: quote: "旗纛之上，施金狼頭。侍衞之士，謂之附離，夏言亦狼也。蓋本狼生，志不忘舊。"
the name "Ashina" is translated by some researchers as "wolf", cf. Tuoba 叱奴 *čino, Middle Mongol činua, Khalkha čono.Boodberg, 1936, p. 182 However, Golden contends that derivation from Mongolic is mistaken.

On the Khor-Asgat inscription, the form Ašїnas is written and is similar to the Sogdian form Ašinas from the Bugut and Karabalgasun steles and the Arabic forms Ašinās and Ašnās  from medieval Islamic sources. Chinese editors usually avoided the coda /-s/. Takashi Ōsawa hypothtically derives the family name Ašїnas from their tribal ancestress's name *A-ši-na and the final element -as, which he explains as a plural suffix (similar to the Turkic Käŋäräs < Käŋär "(Kangar / Kangly)" + suffix -(ä)s) as proposed by Marquart, Melioranskii and others. He further links *A-ši-na to the Xiongnu title 閼氏, which was pronounced *′ât-zie in Late Middle Chinese, meant "wife of a ruler", and might be derived from *aš / eš, *azhi / *ezhi < *ašïn / *ešin, and *azhïn / *ezhin, further from Tungusic *Aši < *asun / *asi < *hasun < *khasu < *kasun < *katsun and Turko-Mongolic *Ači < ačun < *hatun < khatun < katun.

 Legends 
Chinese chroniclers recorded four origin tales, which Golden termed "Wolf Tale I", "Wolf Tale II", "Shemo (Žama) and the Deer Tale" and "Historical Account", of the Turks in dynasty histories and historical compilations "based on or copied from the same source(s) and repeated in later collections of historical tales".

 Wolf Tale I: Ashina was one of ten sons born to a grey she-wolf (see: Asena) in the north of Gaochang.
 Wolf Tale II: The ancestor of the Ashina was a man from the Suo nation (north of Xiongnu) whose mother was a lupine season goddess.
 Shemo and the Deer Tale: The Ashina descended from a skilled archer named Shemo, who had once fallen in love with a sea goddess west of Ashide cave.Youyang Zazu, "vol. 4". Siku Quanshu version, pp. 119, 120, 121 of 161.
 Historical Account: The Ashina were mixture stocks from the Pingliang commandery of eastern Gansu.

These stories were sometimes pieced together to form a chronologically coherent narrative of early Ashina history. However, as the Book of Zhou, the Book of Sui, and the Youyang Zazu were all written around the same time, during the early Tang dynasty, it is debatable whether they could truly be considered chronological or rather should be considered competing versions of the Ashina's origin. The record of Turks in Zhoushu (written in the first half of the seventh century) describes the use of gold by Turks around the mid-fifth century: "(The Turks) put gold sculpture of wolf head on their tuğ banner; their military men were called Fuli, that is, wolf in Chinese. It is because they are descendants of the wolf, and naming so is for not forgetting their ancestors."

According to Klyashtorny, the origin myth of Ashina shared similarities with the Wusun, although there is a significant difference that, whereas in the Wusun myth the wolf saves the ancestor of the tribe, it is not as in the case of the Turks. He also adds that Turk system of beliefs linking at least some sections of the Turk ruling class to the Sogdians and, beyond them, to the Wusun.

 Funeral rite 
The Chronicle of Northern Zhou describes the funeral rites of the Ashina. The deceased were laid to rest in a tent, and animals would be sacrificed around the tent. Relatives of the deceased would ride horses around the tent and ritualistically cut themselves about the face as a display of mourning, or "blood tears". The individual and their belongings would then be incinerated.

According to D. G. Savinov, no burials in South Siberia nor Central Asia that are fully consistent with the description of Ashina burials have been found.

According to D. G. Savinov this may be for several reasons:
 Göktürk burial sites in Central Asia and Southern Siberia are not yet open;
 The source is a compilation in character, and burial rituals and funeral cycle from various sources are listed in a unified manner;
 Göktürk funeral rites in the form in which they are recorded in written sources, developed later on the basis of the various components present in some of the archaeological sites of Southern Siberia of earlier Turkic cultures.

It is thought that the rite of cremation which was adopted by the ruling elite did not spread among the common people of the Qaganate. This may be attributed to the different ethnic origin of the ruling family.

 Physical appearance 
According to the Book of Zhou and History of the Northern Dynasties, the Ashina clan was related to the "Yenisei Kyrgyz",Beishi, "vol. 99 - section Tujue"  who resided near the Pamir mountains and are described as possessing red hair and blue eyes in the New Book of Tang (Xin Tangshu 217b.6147), a description previously used to describe the Wusun. However according to Lee & Kuang (2017), the Göktürks differed from the Qirghiz in their physiognomy and "no comparable depiction of the Kök Türks or Tiele is found in the official Chinese histories." Lee & Kuang state that the most likely explanation for the West Eurasian physiognomy of the Yenisei Kirghiz is a high frequency of the Eurasian Indo-European haplogroup R1a-Z93.

Muqan Qaghan, the third Qaghan of the First Turkic Khaganate, was described by Chinese authors as having an unusual appearance. He had eyes like "colored glazes", he had a red complexion, and his face was wide. "Some of the “Hu", including the Köktürk Qaghan Mu-kan and the Qirghïz Turks, were reported by the Chinese to have Europeoid features, such as aquiline noses, red hair and light-coloured eyes." 

According to Chinese historian Xue Zongzheng, the original Ashina tribe members had physical features that were quite different from those of East Asian people. However, over time, members of the Ashina tribe intermarried with Chinese nobility, which shifted their physical appearance to a more East Asian one. According to Xue, having a physical appearance like a Sogdian was by the time of Qilibi Khan (Ashina Simo), an eighth generation descendant of Bumin Qaghan (founder of the First Turkic Khaganate), presented as a sign of mixed ancestry among the Ashina. This suggests that the transformation of the physical appearance of the Ashina tribe was almost complete by the mid-7th century AD.  

Similarly, Turkish historian Emel Esin noted that the early members of the Ashina tribe, much like the Yenisei Kirghiz, had more Europeoid features, but became more East Asian-looking over time, due to intermarriage. She also wrote that members of the Ashina tribe sought to marry Chinese nobles, "perhaps in the hope of finding an occasion to claim rulership over China, or because the high birth of the mother warranted seniority". Esin notes that the later depiction of an Ashina prince, the Bust of Kul Tigin, has an East Asian appearance.

 Genetics   
According to Canadian scholar Joo-Yup Lee, it is possible that the Ashina tribe belonged to the paternal haplogroup R1a1.

The reasoning for this assumption is that the Ashina tribe was said to be closely related to the Yenisei Kirghiz people, and also to the Iranian Saka. The modern-day descendants of the Yenisei Kirghiz, the Kyrgyz people, have one of the highest frequencies of haplogroup R1a-Z93. This lineage is associated with Indo-Iranians who migrated to the Altai region in the Bronze Age, and is carried by various Türkic groups.  

American historian Peter Golden has reported that genetic testing of the proposed descendants of the Ashina tribe does seem to confirm a link to the Indo-Iranians, emphasizing that "the Turks as a whole ‘were made up of heterogeneous and somatically dissimilar populations". The paternal haplogroup identified in the proposed descendants of the Ashina was R1a-Z2124, the so-called "Pashtun cluster".

The first genetic analysis on an early royal Ashina member (the daughter of Mugan Khagan, the second son of Bumin Khagan, the founder of the Göktürk Khaganate) in 2023 by Xiaoming Yang et al. found nearly exclusively Northeast Asian ancestry (97.7%) next to minor West-Eurasian components (2.7%). The ancient Türkic royal family of the Göktürk Khaganate was found to share genetic affinities to post-Iron Age Tungusic and Mongolic pastoralists, while having heterogeneous relationships towards various Turkic-speaking groups, suggesting genetic heterogeneity and multiple sources of origin for the population of the Turkic empire. According to the authors, these findings "once again validates a cultural diffusion model over a demic diffusion model for the spread of Turkic languages" and refutes "the western Eurasian origin and multiple origin hypotheses" in favor of an East Asian origin for the royal Ashina family.

Legacy
Members of the Ashina dynasty also ruled the Basmyls, and Karluk Yabghu's State; and possibly also Khazars and Karakhanids (if the first Karakhanid ruler Bilge Kul Qadir Khan indeed descended from the Karluk Yabghus).  According to some researchers, the Second Bulgarian Empire's Asen dynasty might be descendants of Ashina.

Gallery

See also 
Timeline of Turks (500–1300)
Turks in the Tang military
Mythology of the Turkic and Mongolian peoples
Shǐ (surname), (史) adopted by some of the Ashina tribe

Notes

References

Sources 
 
 
Findley, Carter Vaughin. The Turks in World History. Oxford University Press, 2005. .
 Golden, Peter. An introduction to the history of the Turkic peoples: Ethnogenesis and state-formation in medieval and early modern Eurasia and the Middle East, Harrassowitz, 1992.

 The Great Soviet Encyclopedia 2nd ed. Soviet Encyclopedia, 1950–1958.
 

Róna-Tas, András. Hungarians and Europe in the Early Middle Ages. Central European University Press, 1999. . Page 280.

 Zhu, Xueyuan. The Origins of Northern China's Ethnicities. Beijing: Zhonghua Shuju, 2004. .
 Xue, Zongzheng. A History of Turks. Beijing: Chinese Social Sciences Press, 1992. .
 Duan: Dingling, Gaoju and Tiele. 1988, pp. 39–41
 Suribadalaha, "New Studies of the Origins of the Mongols", p. 46–47.
 Cheng, Fangyi. "The Research on the Identification Between Tiele and the Oghuric Tribes".

External links 
 Lev Gumilev about the Ashina clan 

Ashina tribe
Khazars
1st millennium in China
Nomadic groups in Eurasia
Turkic dynasties